The Triangle Network, formally known as the Triangle Arts Trust, is an international arts organisation that brings together artists from different countries to explore new ideas and expand the boundaries of their practice.

History
The Triangle Network was established in 1982 by British businessman Robert Loder and sculptor Anthony Caro. It  was initiated through a series of artists' workshops providing an uninterrupted period of two weeks where 20–25 artists from diverse cultural backgrounds engage with each other, to explore new ideas and expand the boundaries of their practice.

David Elliott was appointed to chair the board, succeeding Robert Loder who retired in 2009. Loder remained a trustee of the organization until 2012.

Description
The Triangle Network is organised as a network of artists, visual art organisations, and artists-led workshops. It currently is active in over 30 countries. Each centre within the Network is independent and set up to respond to local needs. The object of the workshops is "to counterbalance the tendency of the Western art world to put the emphasis on the object and its marketing rather than on the creative process itself".

It coalesces grassroots arts organisations around the world (many of which were initiated as workshops while others grew independently), so that artists' mobility, international cultural exchange and capacity building objectives can be shared.

The Triangle Network is registered as a charitable organisation in the UK as the Triangle Arts Trust.

Associated organisations and workshops

Europe
Braziers workshop, UK
The Cornelius Arts Foundation, France
Cyfuniad workshop, UK
Gasworks Gallery, UK
HANGAR, Portugal
Pamoja workshop, UK
Shave workshop, UK
Northings, Tanera Mor, Scotland
Triangle Barcelona workshop, Spain
Triangle France, France

Middle East
Al Mahatta, Palestine
Batroun Projects, Lebanon
Wasla Workshop, Egypt
Open Studio Project Cairo, Egypt
Rybon Art Center, Tehran, Iran

Africa
32° East, Uganda
ABRO International Workshop, Addis Ababa, Ethiopia
Aftershave workshop, Nigeria
Bag Factory, Johannesburg
Batapata workshop, Zimbabwe
Greatmore Studios, Cape Town
Kuona Trust & Wasanii workshop, Kenya
Mbile/Insaka workshops, Zambia
Ngoma workshop, Uganda
Njelele, Zimbabwe
Pachipamwe workshop, Zimbabwe
Partage, Mauritius
Rafiki workshop, Tanzania
Rockston Studios, Zambia
Tenq workshop, Senegal
Thapong workshop, Botswana
Thupelo workshop, Cape Town and Johannesburg
Tulipamwe workshop, Namibia
Ujamaa workshop, Mozambique

Asia and Australia
112A residency, China
Britto Arts Trust, Bangladesh
Burragorang workshop, Australia
Cona Foundation, India
Flats workshop, Australia
Hong Kong International Artists' Workshop
KHOJ, India
Kimberley workshop, Australia
Lijiang workshop, China
No.1 Shanthi Road, India
Organhaus, China
Sutra workshop & residency, Nepal
Theertha, Sri Lanka
Upriver Loft residency, China
Vasl workshop & residency, Pakistan
Village workshop, Rajasthan

United States
Triangle NYC, New York City

Caribbean
CCA (Caribbean Contemporary Arts), Trinidad
Big River workshop, Trinidad
Madinina workshop, Martinique
Proyecto Batiscafo, Cuba
Soroa workshop, Cuba
Watamula workshop, Curaçao
Xayamaca workshop, Jamaica

South America
Capacete, Brazil
El Basilisco, Argentina
Festival de Performance, Cali, Colombia
Helena Producciones, Colombia
Kiosko/Simple, Bolivia
Km0 (kilometro zero), Bolivia
La Llama, Venezuela
Lugar a Dudas, Colombia
PIVÔ, Brazil
URRA, Argentina

References

External links
[

Arts organizations